Hospital General is a railway station of the Ferrocarrils de la Generalitat de Catalunya (FGC) train system in Vallès Occidental in the province of Barcelona, Catalonia, Spain. It is served by FGC lines S1 and S7. The station is in fare zone 2C.

The station is named after the nearby Hospital Universitari General de Catalunya (Translation: General Teaching Hopital of Catalonia), a private hospital in Sant Cugat del Valles.

The station was opened in 1985.

References

Stations on the Barcelona–Vallès Line
Railway stations in Vallès Occidental
Railway stations in Spain opened in 1985